Bruno Raes (born 21 Juli 1967) is a Belgian former professional darts player.

Career
Raes qualified for the 1991 BDO World Darts Championship, losing in the first round to Ronnie Baxter. Raes then won the 1991 German Open, beating American Steve Brown in the final. He made a second appearance in the Lakeside in the 1995 BDO World Darts Championship, losing in the first round 3–1 to Martin Adams, despite taking the first set. The year also saw Raes win the Spring Cup, the Belgium National Championship and the Belgium Gold Cup. He returned to Lakeside for the 1996 BDO World Darts Championship, again losing in the first round 3–0 to Andy Jenkins.

Raes then disappeared from the circuit, only to return in 2007, playing in the German Gold Cup. He then went on to regain the Belgium Gold Cup in 2008, 13 years after his first success. Raes then played in his very first World Masters campaign, but lost in the very first round to Pavel Drtil of the Czech Republic.

World Championship results

BDO
1991: First round (lost to Ronnie Baxter 1–3)
1995: First round (lost to Martin Adams 1–3)
1996: First round (lost to Andy Jenkins 0–3)

External links
Profile and stats on Darts Database

Belgian darts players
Living people
British Darts Organisation players
1957 births
Sportspeople from Aalst, Belgium